Mongolia is scheduled to compete in the 2017 Asian Winter Games in Sapporo and Obihiro, Japan from February 19 to 26. Mongolia is scheduled to compete in four sports (seven disciplines). The Mongolian team consists of 46 athletes, six less than the number the country sent to the last games six years ago.

On February 16, 2017, it was announced that biathlete Erdenechimeg Barkhuu would be the country's flagbearer during the parade of nations at the opening ceremony. Barkhuu will become the first biathlete to carry the national flag at an opening ceremony.

Competitors
The following table lists the Mongolian delegation per sport and gender.

Alpine skiing

Biathlon

Cross-country skiing

Freestyle skiing

Ice hockey

Mongolia has entered a men's team. The team will compete in division one. Mongolia finished in fourth place (8th place overall) in division 1 of the competition.

Men's tournament

Mongolia was represented by the following 18 athletes:

Baatarkhuu Bazarvaani (G)
Munkhbold Bayarsaikhan (G)
Batgerel Zorigt (D)
Boldbayar Bayajikh (D)
Enkhsukh Erdenetogtokh (D)
Och Tsendbaatar (D)
Zolboo Dorjsuren (D)
Tamir Ganbold (D)
Munkhuu Boldbaatar (D)
Gerelt Ider (F)
Altangerel Ichinnorov (F)
Erdenesukh Bold (F)
Shinebayar Tsogtoo (F)
Batzaya Purevdorj (F)
Bayarsaikhan Jargalsaikhan (F)
Mishigsuren Namjil (F)
Batbold Munkhbayar (F)
Tserenbaljir Baatarkhuu (F)

Legend: G = Goalie, D = Defense, F = Forward

Short track speed skating

Speed skating

Mongolia's speed skating team consisted of seven athletes (four men and three women). However, only four eventually competed in races.

References

Nations at the 2017 Asian Winter Games
Mongolia at the Asian Winter Games
2017 in Mongolian sport